This is a list of lighthouses in Senegal.

Lighthouses

See also
List of lighthouses in Mauritania (to the north)
List of lighthouses in the Gambia 
List of lighthouses in Guinea-Bissau (to the south)
 Lists of lighthouses and lightvessels

References

External links

Senegal
Lighthouses
Lighthouses